AM-2232 (1-(4-cyanobutyl)-3-(naphthalen-1-oyl)indole) is a drug that acts as a potent but unselective agonist for the cannabinoid receptors, with a Ki of 0.28 nM at CB1 and 1.48 nM at CB2.

In the United States, all CB1 receptor agonists of the 3-(1-naphthoyl)indole class such as AM-2232 are Schedule I Controlled Substances.

See also
 AM-694
 AM-1235
 AM-2233
 FUBIMINA
 JWH-018
 List of AM cannabinoids
 List of JWH cannabinoids
 O-774
 O-1057
 O-1812
 THJ-2201

References

Naphthoylindoles
Nitriles
AM cannabinoids
Designer drugs